Ignacio Agüero (born 7 March July 1952) is a Chilean documentary filmmaker who famously co-directed No to Pinochet television spots during Chile's 1988 referendum. He is also known for his work as a character actor in art films and TV miniseries' directed by Raúl Ruiz and José Luis Torres Leiva.

Select filmography

Director
 Aquí se construye (1977)
 No olvidar (1982)
 Como me da la gana (1985)
 One Hundred Children Waiting for a Train (1988)
 Dreams of Ice (1993)
 Neruda, todo el amor (1998)
 Aquí se construye (o Ya no existe el lugar donde nací) (2000)
 Agustín's Newspaper (2008)
 The Other Day (2013)

Actor
 Days in the Country (2004)
 La Recta Provincia (2007)
 Litoral (2008)
 The Sky, the Earth and the Rain (2008)
 Summer (2011)
 Voice Over (2014)

References

External links

Chilean film directors
Chilean documentary film directors
1952 births
Living people